Gregory "Greg" Heffley is a fictional character in the Diary of a Wimpy Kid franchise, serving as the antiheroic main protagonist and unreliable narrator of the books, online series, and multimedia franchise. He was created by Jeff Kinney, and portrayed by Zachary Gordon & Jason Drucker in the first three films and the fourth film, respectively.

Characteristics and role 
Greg was originally conceptualized in 1998, after creator Jeff Kinney struggled to become a newspaper cartoonist. In all of his appearances, Greg is portrayed as a self-righteous narcissist, who has little-to-no moral compass, is only looking out for himself, and has an obsession with becoming rich and famous. He steals, lies, cheats, and is a bully to the few less popular than him at Westmore Middle School. Greg is obsessed with his social status, but is bullied by the bigger students at his school and his older teenage brother, Rodrick. He often mistreats his best and only friend, Rowley, for being wimpy and socially inept, despite Rowley having a happy family and life. Greg receives bad grades in school, is addicted to video games, especially the fictional Twisted Wizard, and loves junk food. Despite these negative traits, he does show humanity, sensitivity, and care for those he loves.

Because of these qualities, internet users began to question if Greg was a sociopath. Jeff Kinney stated:

Kinney, on separate occasions, has also clarified that Greg is supposed to represent the average kid, and doesn't do anything a normal selfish middle schooler wouldn't. Jeff never intended to write books for children, which is why Greg is a complicated and flawed character.

Theatrical Appearances

In the original trilogy of the film series adaptations, Greg was portrayed by actor Zachary Gordon. In the film adaptation of The Long Haul however, Greg was instead portrayed by Jason Drucker. After the film series was given a reboot during the acquisition of 21st Century Fox, Greg was voiced by Brady Noon in the animated adaptation of the first book.

Reception
Due to Greg's narcissistic and selfish traits, some parents began to question if Greg was a negative influence on kids. In Texas in October 2018, Greg's bad morals and pessimistic world view challenged the book to be banned. In 2008, Aish called the character "totally diabolical" and that parents should avoid the series at all costs. Tidy Books wrote that Greg never learned from his lessons and rarely gets punished or gives sincere apologies, and that the writing is too subtle for kids to realize that he is doing the wrong thing and is an unreliable narrator.

His film counterpart was given similar reception as Rotten Tomatoes has said that Greg is an "unlikable protagonist". Margaret Pomeranz disliked the character of Greg Heffley, saying "I really thought he was unpleasant. I did not want to spend time with him. I couldn't wait for the end of this film." However, reception to the character improved since the first film and in her review of the Dog Days film, Abby West of Entertainment Weekly wrote that "though often self-centered and conniving, Greg remains a likeable kid".

References

Notes 

Child characters in literature
Child characters in film
Male characters in literature
Male characters in film
Literary characters introduced in 2004
Fictional con artists
Diary of a Wimpy Kid